The Grudziądz tram system is a tram system in Grudziądz, Poland that has been in operation since 1896. There is one  line in regular operation, one of 2 other lines is occasionally run when part of the network is temporarily closed down or otherwise inaccessible. Grudziądz is the smallest city in Poland to have a tram system.

Rolling stock

Lines

Regular

Temporary
These lines run only during long-term disruptions (e.g. track or roadworks) that cut off one of the termini from the rest of the network.

References

External links
Grudziądz tramway at UrbanRail.net

Grudziądz
Grudziądz
Metre gauge railways in Poland
Grudziądz